Prasinovirus is a genus of large double-stranded DNA viruses, in the family Phycodnaviridae that infect phytoplankton in the Prasinophyceae. There are two species in this genus, including Micromonas pusilla virus SP1, which infects the cosmopolitan photosynthetic flagellate Micromonas pusilla.

There is a large group of genetically diverse but related viruses that show considerable evidence of lateral gene transfer.

Taxonomy

The genus contains the following species:
 Micromonas pusilla virus SP1
 Ostreococcus tauri virus OtV5

Structure

Viruses in Prasinovirus are enveloped, with icosahedral and round geometries, and T=169 symmetry. The diameter is around 104-118 nm.

Life cycle
Viral replication is nucleo-cytoplasmic. Replication follows the DNA strand displacement model. Dna templated transcription is the method of transcription. The virus exits the host cell by lysis via lytic phospholipids. Alga serve as the natural host. Transmission routes are passive diffusion.

References

External links
 Viralzone: Prasinovirus
 ICTV

Phycodnaviridae
Virus genera